Defluviimonas alba is a Gram-negative and rod-shaped bacterium from the genus of Defluviimonas which has been isolated from water from the Xinjiang Oilfield in China.

References 

Rhodobacteraceae
Bacteria described in 2015